The 1934 VPI Gobblers football team represented Virginia Agricultural and Mechanical College and Polytechnic Institute in the 1934 college football season. The team was led by their head coach Henry Redd and finished with a record of five wins and five losses (5–5).

Schedule

NFL Draft selections

Players

Roster

Varsity letter winners
Twenty players received varsity letters for their participation on the 1934 VPI team.

References 

VPI
Virginia Tech Hokies football seasons
VPI Gobblers